Gonionota intonans is a moth in the family Depressariidae. It was described by Edward Meyrick in 1933. It is found in Argentina.

References

Moths described in 1933
Gonionota